The AMA Journal of Ethics is a monthly open-access (no subscription or publication fees) publication that includes peer-reviewed content, expert commentary, podcasts, medical education articles, policy discussions, and cases covering areas of medical ethics.

It was established in 1999 as Virtual Mentor, obtaining its current name in 2015. It is published by the American Medical Association and the editor-in-chief is Audiey C. Kao.  Themes are student and resident-driven, and issue editors are selected annually to work with editorial staff and expert contributors.

Abstracting and Indexing 
The journal is indexed in MEDLINE.

References

External links

Bioethics journals
American Medical Association academic journals
Monthly journals
Online-only journals
Publications established in 1999
English-language journals
1999 establishments in the United States